"Lock All the Doors" is a song by the English rock band Noel Gallagher's High Flying Birds. It was written and produced by Noel Gallagher for the band's second studio album Chasing Yesterday (2015). In late August 2015, the song was released as the album's fourth single.

Gallagher first wrote the chorus and one verse of the song in the 1990s but took 23 years to complete it, having given away the verse to The Chemical Brothers during the recording sessions for "Setting Sun". After struggling to rewrite a verse to fit with the chorus in the years that followed, Gallagher has stated the melody for the verse suddenly came to him "without even thinking about it", when leaving a Tesco Metro on a Sunday evening in 2014. The chorus originally surfaced on an Oasis demo tape from 1992 as a song that later became "My Sister Lover", a B-side to "Stand by Me".

Track listing

Charts

Weekly charts

References

Noel Gallagher's High Flying Birds songs
2015 songs
2015 singles
Songs written by Noel Gallagher